Azadogly is a rural locality (a selo) in Magaramkentsky District, Republic of Dagestan, Russia. The population was 1,697 as of 2010. There are 28 streets.

Geography 
Azadogly is located 32 km northeast of Magaramkent (the district's administrative centre) by road. Kumuk and Nyugdi are the nearest rural localities.

Nationalities 
Lezgins live there.

References 

Rural localities in Magaramkentsky District